Zoltán Balczó (born 1 January 1948) is a Hungarian politician and a former Member of the European Parliament (MEP) from Hungary between 2009–2010 and 2014–2019. He is a member of Jobbik. He is a former Deputy Speaker of the National Assembly of Hungary. He was a Member of Parliament from 1998 to 2002, from 2010 to 2014 and from 2019 to 2022.

His older brother is András Balczó, the Olympic champion.

After the 2010 elections, he was appointed one of the deputy speakers of the National Assembly of Hungary. As a result, he was replaced by Béla Kovács in the European Parliament. He was elected MEP again in the 2014 European Parliament election; as a result, he resigned from his national parliamentary mandate in June 2014.

See also
2009 European Parliament election in Hungary

External links
Balczó Zoltán Bio on jobbik.hu 
MEP profile

References

1948 births
Living people
People from Nyíregyháza
Hungarian Justice and Life Party politicians
Jobbik politicians
Members of the National Assembly of Hungary (1998–2002)
Members of the National Assembly of Hungary (2010–2014)
Members of the National Assembly of Hungary (2014–2018)
Members of the National Assembly of Hungary (2018–2022)
Jobbik MEPs
MEPs for Hungary 2009–2014
MEPs for Hungary 2014–2019